The Hidden Room is an American drama-horror anthology television series geared mainly towards women, which aired on the Lifetime cable network for 33 episodes from 1991 to 1993. Each episode usually centered around a woman in a hardship, but with a dark Twilight Zone-ish twist. Most episodes starred a well-known actress in the lead role.

The first season was hosted by a mysterious woman (Mimi Kuzyk) who spoke cryptically. She was credited only as the woman in the hidden room. The second season had no host and in 1993, when Lifetime aired repeats of some first-season episodes, the scenes with the host were edited out.

Episodes

Season 1 (1991)

Season 2 (1993)

References

External links

1991 American television series debuts
1993 American television series endings
English-language television shows
1990s American anthology television series
1990s American horror television series
Lifetime (TV network) original programming